Bary may refer to:

 René Bary, 17th century French historiographer and rhetorician
 Bary, Iran (disambiguation), places in Iran
 Hendrik Bary (c.1632 – 1707), Dutch engraver
 Léon Bary (1880–1954), French actor
 Helen Valeska Bary (1888–1973), American suffragist
 Pascal Bary (born 1953), French racehorse trainer

See also
Bary Glacier, Jacobsen Bight, South Georgia
De Bary (disambiguation)
Bari (disambiguation)